Potop (deluge in most Slavic languages) may refer to:
 The Deluge (novel) (original title: Potop), a historical novel by Henryk Sienkiewicz
 The Deluge (film) (original title: Potop), a 1974 movie directed by Jerzy Hoffman, based on Sienkiewicz's novel
 Deluge (history) (Polish: potop or potop szwedzki), a Swedish and Russian invasion and occupation of the Polish–Lithuanian Commonwealth
 , a village in Bulgaria
 Potop (river), a tributary of the Sabar in Dâmbovița County, Romania